Eurythenes plasticus is a species of amphipod of the genus Eurythenes, first described in 2020. It was named in reference to the PET plastic found in its stomach, after researchers wanted to highlight the impact of plastic pollution.

Researchers from Newcastle University caught four specimens, one of which had plastic particles in its body.

References

Eurythenes
Plastics and the environment
Crustaceans described in 2020